VERDES (short for Verdad y Democracia Social, 'Truth and Social Democracy'; the acronym means Greens) was a liberal-conservative political party in the Department of Santa Cruz, Bolivia founded in 2009 and was led by Rubén Costas. In the 2010 departmental elections, Costas won the governorship of Santa Cruz, which he had previously governed as prefect.

Verdes held its first congress in June 2011.

The party was dissolved in August 2013, and its members joined the ranks of the Democrat Social Movement.

References

Further reading
 VERDES Declaration of Principles (Spanish)

2009 establishments in Bolivia
2013 disestablishments in Bolivia
Conservative parties in Bolivia
Defunct political parties in Bolivia
Green parties in South America
Liberal conservative parties
Liberal parties in Bolivia
Political parties disestablished in 2013
Political parties established in 2009